Steve Nelson may refer to:

 Steve Nelson (activist) (1903–1993), Communist Party member, Spanish Civil War veteran and U.S. Supreme Court litigant
 Steve Nelson (songwriter) (1907–1981), radio producer and singer, co-writer of "Frosty the Snowman"
 Steve Nelson (American football) (born 1951), New England Patriots football player
 Steve Nelson (vibraphonist) (born 1954), American musician
 Stephen L. Nelson (born 1959), American author of computer books
 Stephen Nelson (sportscaster) (born 1989), American television personality and play-by-play commentator
 Steven Sharp Nelson (born 1977), American cellist and songwriter
 Steven Nelson (born 1993), American football player
 Steve Nelson, creator of the web programming framework Fusebox